Lewis Fry   (16 April 1832 – 10 September 1921) was a Quaker, lawyer, philanthropist and a Liberal and later Liberal and Unionist politician who sat in the House of Commons in three spells between 1878 and 1900.

Early life
He was articled to a Quaker Solicitor, Joseph Bevan Braithwaite, who had also trained his elder brother, Edward Fry. He was admitted in 1854 and practiced in Bristol until he entered Parliament.

Parliamentary service
Fry was  Liberal Member of Parliament (MP) for Bristol between 1878 and 1885, and a Liberal and Unionist for Bristol North between 1885–1892 and 1895–1900.

He was sworn a member of the Privy Council after the accession of King Edward VII on 24 January 1901 and was appointed a deputy lieutenant of Gloucestershire shortly thereafter.

He was Chairman of Parliamentary Committee on Town Holdings, 1886–1892 and author of two reports of same.

Other public service
Fry served on Bristol Town Council from 1866 to 1884 

When School Boards were introduced, Lewis Fry was elected the first Chair of the Bristol School Board. He drew up an influential scheme for religious education in elementary schools.

He supported a number of Bristol public institutions: the School of Science and Art, the Museum and Library and the Evening Classes Association and the local branch of the Charities Organization Society.

He was on the Council of Clifton College and was President of the High School for Girls.

He served on the Council of the Law Society.

He was also the president of the Anchor Society in Bristol in 1868.

Fry is considered to be an important figure in the creation and early development of the University of Bristol. He was the first chairman of the Council of the University of Bristol. An annual public lecture at the University is his memorial.

One of his chief pleasures was his interest in art, and was himself an amateur painter.

Marriage and family
On 29 September 1858, he married Elizabeth Pease Gibson, the only daughter of the banker Francis Gibson of Saffron Walden, Essex. They had two sons and three daughters. She died in 1870. Their children are:
Lewis George (b.3 July 1860)
Elizabeth Wyatt (b.31 July 1861), married in 1902 to Eugene Hugo Mallett, youngest son of Sir Louis Mallet.
Francis Gibson (b.25 May 1863)
Millicent Mary (b. 20 August 1866)
Anna Theodora (b.24 August 1870)

Death
He lived at Goldney Hall in Clifton.  It is now a Hall of Residence of the University. He died shortly after celebrating his 89th birthday.

The Lewis Fry Memorial Lecture was established in 1924 by his surviving children. The endowment provides for an annual lecture to be given by a scholar of distinction on subjects connected with the Fine Arts, History, Literature, Music, Drama, Philosophy, Theology or Education.

References

External links 
 

1832 births
1921 deaths
British Quakers
Deputy Lieutenants of Gloucestershire
Lewis Fry
Gibson family of Saffron Walden
Liberal Unionist Party MPs for English constituencies
Liberal Party (UK) MPs for English constituencies
Members of the Privy Council of the United Kingdom
UK MPs 1885–1886
UK MPs 1886–1892
UK MPs 1895–1900